Club Atlético Morelia is a Mexican football club based in Morelia, Michoacán. Founded on 4 June 1950, the club currently plays in the Liga de Expansión MX. The club play their home games at Estadio Morelos.

From 1981 to 2020, the club played in Mexico top-flight football league, winning the Invierno 2000 championship. On 2 June 2020, it was officially announced that the club would be relocating to Mazatlan. Later that month, it was announced that city of Morelia would have a franchise in the Liga de Expansión MX named Atlético Morelia.

History

Beginnings 
In 1950 "Oro Morelia" changed the name to Club Deportivo Morelia. Morelia was among the teams that founded the Segunda División. After the 1956–1957 season, in which they ended up in second place, they were officially promoted into the Primera División to replace Puebla. After an unsuccessful season, in 1968 Atlético Morelia was relegated back to the Segunda División. During mixed 1968–1971 seasons, C.A. Morelia appointed Nicandro Ortiz as chairman. Ortiz acquired the team and strengthened its position in the league.

The 1978–1979 season thrust Morelia into contention for promotion; in 1980, Atlético Morelia played under manager Diego Malta who helped his team towards the Mexico Championship and finally promotion to the Primera División in 1981.

In 1986 before the World Cup in Mexico Atletico Morelia played friendlies against Germany Losing 2-1 and against the URSS again losing 4-1.

In 1996 the major broadcast company TV Azteca bought the team. By 2000 the club started playing under the Monarcas moniker.

Although the team had played Mexican professional football for 70 years, it had never won a first division tournament until winter 2000, when the club raised the cup after beating Toluca on penalties. The team was crowned champions away in the Bombonera Stadium. The Morelos Stadium has never been the site of its team winning a final. On the day after the victory, a crowd that some estimate at 100 thousand people welcomed the team as it paraded along Morelia's main avenue, Avenida Madero on their way to the stadium where the crowd congregated as the team raised the cup and the fans congratulated the team for its first ever first division trophy.

After missing the playoffs for three consecutive tournaments, Morelia finished in third place in the general table in the Apertura 2009. Morelia defeated Santos Laguna in the first round, 4–2 on aggregate. Morelia was then defeated by Cruz Azul in a semi-final that was filled with controversy due to Cruz Azul player Joel Huiqui intentionally using his hand to hit the ball away and prevent Morelia midfielder Wilson Tíago from scoring. (Huiqui later played for Morelia.) With a 2–1 aggregate score, Morelia was eliminated. Morelia qualified for the 2010 Copa Libertadores by ending in third place in the classification phase. It was the second time that Morelia participated in the Copa Libertadores, the first being in 2002. Morelia was the Runner-up of the Clausura 2011, after a hard-fought final against Pumas. Pumas won the tie 3–2 on aggregate, taking the trophy home.

In 2010, Morelia became the SuperLiga champion, with a 2–1 victory in the finals over the New England Revolution in which Miguel Sabah scored both Morelia goals.

On November 5, 2013 Monarcas Morelia won their first Copa MX title in a 3–3 match that went to penalties, where they would take the victory. This title also allowed them to participate in the inaugural edition Supercopa MX, which they won against Tigres UANL with a global score of 5–4.

Relegation struggles 
After 15 years, a dismal 2014–15 campaign left Monarcas as one of the last teams in the relegation table, an aggregate of a club's most recent points totals that decides which teams will be relegated. As a result, Enrique Meza was chosen to be the coach for the Apertura 2015 season. Meza had already saved Morelia before, in the 1995–96 season. After no notable improvement in team performance, Meza was let go from the position of head coach in 2016, with Roberto Hernandez taking over as interim manager. Hernandez's tenure would coincide with the signing of Peruvian forward Raul Ruidiaz on loan from Universitario. The signing of Ruidiaz would prove to be crucial to the club's fortunes, as he would go on to score 20 goals throughout the 2016-2017 Liga MX season, finishing as top scorer with 11 goals in the Apertura and 9 goals in the Clausura. In the following season, Morelia was in danger of being relegated on the final match day of the Apertura, residing in last place in the relegation table and needing a victory over Monterrey to avoid the drop. Tied 1-1 in injury time, Raul Rudiaz scored a crucial winner that moved them out of the relegation zone, with Jaguares de Chiapas being relegated in their stead. Ruidiaz's goal additionally qualified them for that season's liguilla, its first since the 2016 Clausura.

Relocation 
On May 23, 2020, various news outlets in Mexico reported the club would be relocating from Morelia to Mazatlán, Sinaloa and would be called Mazatlán F.C. The club's owner, Grupo Salinas, reportedly were asking for $400 million MXN per year from the Government of Michoacán to keep the team in the city. The move was very unpopular among supporters, former players, and the sports media across Mexico. Despite stay-at-home orders due to the COVID-19 pandemic, over 7,000 fans took to the streets of Morelia to protest the team's move.

On June 2, 2020, the club and Liga MX announced the club's relocation to Mazatlán, just two days before the club's 70th anniversary.

Rebirth of Atlético Morelia
On June 26, 2020, Liga MX President Enrique Bonilla announced Atlético Zacatepec would be relocating to Morelia due to financial problems. The next day in a press conference at Estadio Morelos, it was announced the club would be called Club Atlético Morelia, the club's name for over 25 years before Grupo Salinas changed it in 1999. It was announced the ownership group would consist of former Guadalajara President José Luis Higuera as well as various businessmen from the state of Michoacán. The ownership group acquired the rights to the club's name and logo, both which were owned by Grupo Salinas.

Badges

Kit
The club's colors are generated from the city's flag which are yellow and red, which are the same colors in the Spanish flag, because the city is a novohispana city.

In the club's beginnings the club went under the name of Oro and were known as the canarios (canary) until 1999 when the club changed its name to Monarcas, due to the 3 monarchs found in the city's flag, which has been used from its foundation.

Stadium

Towards the end of the 1980s it was decided that their stadium (Estadio Venustiano Carranza) was lacking capacity and that a new stadium with a greater number of seats needed to be constructed. On April 9, 1989, after several construction delays, Stadium Jose Maria Morelos and Pavón (located on the outskirts of the Quinceo mountain) was opened, and the inaugural game was between Atlético Morelia and Club América. The stadium has an official capacity of 45,000, although on inauguration in 1989 it is estimated that more than 50,000 were in attendance. Morelia won the match with the score 2–1. In 2011, the stadium was given a new look, seeing as the FIFA U-17 World Cup was taking place in Mexico.

Personnel

Management

Coaching staff

Players

Morelia has had some notable players in their history. Marco Antonio Figueroa is the club's all-time leading scorer with 130 goals. Adolfo Bautista, Rafael Márquez Lugo, Moisés Muñoz, Miguel Sabah, Joel Huiqui, Adrián Aldrete, Enrique Pérez, Édgar Lugo and Elias Hernandez, are some of the players that were called up to the Mexico national team while playing with the team. Raul Ruidiaz was the first Morelia player to achieve a Liga MX top scoring title.

First-team squad

Out on loan

Reserve teams

Reserve team that plays in the Liga TDP, the fourth level of the Mexican league system.

Top Goalscorers

Includes top scorers from both Atletico Morelia & Monarcas Morelia
Does not include international competition goals

Honours

Domestic

Primera División: 1
Invierno 2000
Runner-up (3): Apertura 2002, Clausura 2003, Clausura 2011

Segunda División/Liga de Expansión MX: 2
1981
Clausura 2022
Runner-up (1): Guardianes 2021

Copa MX: 1
Apertura 2013
Runner-up (2): 1964–65, Clausura 2017

Supercopa MX: 1
2014
Runner-up (1): 2015

InternationalNorth American SuperLiga: 12010CONCACAF Champions' Cup: 0'Runner-up (2): 2002, 2003

Managers

 Carlos Miloc (1979–80)
 Árpád Fekete (1982)
 Antonio "Tota" Carbajal (1984–94) 
 Jesus Bracamontes (1989–90), (1991–93)
 Carlos Miloc (1995–96)
 Enrique Meza (Feb 24, 1996 – June 30, 1996)
 Tomás Boy (Sept 6, 1996 – June 30, 1997)
 Eduardo Solari (1997–98)
 Tomás Boy (July 1, 1998 – June 30, 2000)
 Luis Fernando Tena (July 1, 2000 – Oct 22, 2001)
 Miguel Ángel Russo (Oct 27, 2001 – Feb 16, 2002)
 Rubén Omar Romano (Feb 24, 2002 – Feb 22, 2004)
 Antonio Mohamed (Feb 24, 2004 – June 30, 2004)
 Eduardo Acevedo (2004–05)
 Ricardo Ferretti (Jan 1, 2005 – Dec 31, 2005)
 Sergio Bueno (Jan 1, 2006 – Feb 6, 2006)
 Darío Franco (Feb 10, 2006 – June 30, 2006)
 Hugo Hernández (July 1, 2006 – Sept 18, 2006)
 Marco Antonio Figueroa (Sept 22, 2006 – June 30, 2007)
 José Luis Trejo (July 1, 2007 – Oct 22, 2007)
 David Patiño (Oct 22, 2007 – March 16, 2008)
 Luis Fernando Tena (March 17, 2008 – Feb 19, 2009)
 Tomás Boy (Feb 20, 2009 – June 30, 2012)
 Rubén Omar Romano (July 1, 2012 – Feb 18, 2013)
 Carlos Bustos (Feb 18, 2013 – Jan 26, 2014)
 Eduardo de la Torre (Jan 27, 2014 – March 1, 2014)
 R. Hernández (interim) (March 2, 2014 – March 10, 2014)
 Ángel David Comizzo (March 10, 2014 – Sept 3, 2014)
 José Guadalupe Cruz (Sept 3, 2014 – Dec 1, 2014)
 Alfredo Tena (Dec 4, 2014 – Feb 15, 2015)
 R. Hernández (interim)'' (feb 15, 2015 – May 8, 2015)
 Enrique Meza (May 17, 2015– October 23, 2016)
 Pablo Marini (Dec 2, 2016- Feb 6, 2017)
 R. Hernández (Feb 07, 2017– Feb 24, 2019)
 Javier Torrente (Feb 28, 2019- August 18, 2019)
 Pablo Guede (August 18, 2019-June 1st 2020)
 Ricardo Valiño (June 26, 2020-May 28, 2022)
 Gabriel Pereyra (May 29, 2022–February 27, 2023)
 Carlos Adrián Morales (February 27, 2023–present)

References

External links

 

 
Football clubs in Michoacán
Association football clubs established in 1924
Liga MX teams
1924 establishments in Mexico
Sports team relocations